Ronald William Yankowski  (born October 22, 1946 in Arlington, Massachusetts) is a former defensive end who played 10 seasons in the National Football League for the St. Louis Cardinals. Yankowski played college football at Kansas State University and Northeastern Oklahoma A&M College.

Yankowski was drafted in the eighth round by the St. Louis Cardinals in 1971 and started ten games at defensive end his rookie season. The biggest play of his career came in a 1974 game at Washington when he returned a Billy Kilmer fumble 71 yards for a touchdown to help the Cards to a 17-10 victory. Yankowski played in 128 games during his ten-year career in St. Louis and finished with five fumble recoveries and 30 sacks.

References

1946 births
Living people
People from Arlington, Massachusetts
American football defensive ends
Kansas State Wildcats football players
St. Louis Cardinals (football) players
Northeastern Oklahoma A&M Golden Norsemen football players
Sportspeople from Middlesex County, Massachusetts